Ompa til du dør (Dance 'till you die) is the debut album of Norwegian alternative rock group Kaizers Orchestra, released on 1 September 2001.

Background 
After the dissolution of frontman Janove Ottesen and guitarist Geir Zahl's previous band, gnom, the two created a new band. Building off of the song "Bastard", Kaizers Orchestra was slowly formed. The first known concert featuring Kaizers Orchestra songs was held at a pub called Det Beste Stedet (The Best Place) in Sandnes, Norway. A week during the summer of 2000, Janove and Geir performed as Blod, snått & juling, gnom and Kaizers Orchestra on acoustic guitars, as summer jobs. The owner of the establishment, Osman, backed up the band on drums. Some of the songs played were "Bøn fra helvete", "Ompa til du dør" and "Resistansen".

After the band re-hired Rune Solheim, Jon Sjøen and Helge Risa, they recorded a 14-track demo. Among the tracks recorded was a different version of "Bastard", as well as three songs that were later scrapped: "Abstinenser", "Damplokomotiv", and "Stormfull vals". In 2001, a second guitarist, Terje Vinterstø, became a member of the band. After landing a deal with the independent label Broiler Farm, recording commenced for their first studio album. During this period, the songs "Bris", "170" and "Kontroll på kontinentet" were written and seemingly replaced "Abstinenser", "Damplokomotiv" and "Bastard" (whose organ riff is the same used on "170") respectively. "Stormfull vals" was dropped, eventually resurfacing on Våre demoner, a compilation of unused demos.

Promotion and release 
A video was shot for the song "Kontroll på kontinentet" in 2001, which received some airplay on ZTV, a music channel similar to MTV. Though it did not receive much attention from critics upon its initial release, Ompa til du dør received top marks from nearly all major news bodies in Norway, and it quickly shot to the top of the VG Lista album charts.

In early 2002, Ompa til du dør won the "Best Album Award" at Spellemannprisen. They also received an award for "Best Live Act". Later in 2002, after their concert at the Roskilde Festival, the band gained international recognition. Ompa til du dør was subsequently released in a revised international edition, featuring the two additional tracks "Død manns tango", and "Mann mot mann", as well as a slightly altered track listing. It was also released as a bundle with the Død manns tango EP.

Track listing 
Lyrics for all songs are in the Norwegian language. All songs written by Janove Ottesen, except where noted.  Some songs co-written with Geir Zahl.

Original track listing 
 "Kontroll på kontinentet" (Control over the Continent) – 4:03
 "Ompa til du dør" (Dance 'till you Die) – 5:06
 "Bøn fra helvete" (Prayer from Hell) (Ottesen/Zahl) – 4:02
 "170" – 4:15
 "Rullett" (Roulette) (Zahl) – 2:50
 "Dr. Mowinckel" (Zahl) – 3:13
 "Fra sjåfør til passasjer" (From Driver to Passenger) – 5:02
 "Resistansen" (The Resistance) – 3:02
 "Dekk bord" (Set the Table) (Ottesen/Zahl) – 3:38
 "Bak et halleluja" (Behind a Hallelujah) – 1:59
 "Bris" (Breeze) – 3:37
 "Mr. Kaizer, hans Constanze og meg" (Mr. Kaizer, his Constanze and I) – 3:29

International edition track listing 
 "Kontroll på kontinentet" – 4:00
 "Ompa til du dør" – 5:04
 "Bøn fra helvete" – 4:00
 "Død manns tango" (Dead Man's Tango) – 4:20
 "170" – 4:18
 "Rullett" – 2:43
 "Dr. Mowinckel" – 3:11
 "Fra sjåfør til passasjer" – 5:00
 "Mann mot mann" (Man against Man) – 4:35
 "Bak et halleluja" – 1:56
 "Resistansen" – 3:00
 "Bris" – 3:32
 "Dekk bord" – 3:37
 "Mr. Kaizer, hans Constanze og meg" – 3:28

Demo 
 "Resistansen" – 3:15
 "Ompa til du dør" – 4:53
 "Bøn fra helvete" – 3:57
 "Bak et halleluja" – 2:15
 "Dr. Mowinckel" – 2:44
 "Abstinenser" (Abstinences) – 5:08
 "Damplokomotiv" (Steam Locomotive) – 4:04
 "Bastard" – 3:17
 "Katastrofen" (The Catastrophe) – 2:14
 "Fra sjåfør til passasjer" – 4:58
 "Rullett" – 2:58
 "Dekk bord" – 3:49
 "Stormfull vals" (Stormy Waltz) (Zahl) – 3:25
 "Mr. Kaizer, hans Constanze og meg" – 3:41

Personnel 
 Janove Ottesen – Vocals, back-up choir, guitar, piano, marimba
 Geir Zahl – Electric guitar, vocals, back-up choir
 Terje Winterstø Røthing – Electric guitar, back-up choir, mandolin, tambourin
 Rune Solheim – Drums, percussion
 Helge Risa – Pump organ, piano
 Jon Sjøen – Double bass, electric bass
 Stian Carstensen – Producer, banjo, kaval
 Jørgen Træen — Producer, audio mixing
 Jan Kåre Hystad – Saxophone
 Atle Øksendal — Graphic design

References

Kaizers Orchestra albums
2001 debut albums